Michael D. Vandeveer was the mayor of Evansville, Indiana from 1980 until he resigned in 1987 to take a job in the private sector.

See also
1979 Evansville, Indiana mayoral election
1983 Evansville, Indiana mayoral election

References

Year of birth missing (living people)
Living people
Mayors of Evansville, Indiana
Place of birth missing (living people)